"Let Forever Be" is a song by English electronic music duo the Chemical Brothers, released as the second single from their third studio album, Surrender (1999), on 2 August 1999. It contains uncredited vocals from Noel Gallagher of Britpop band Oasis, who also co-wrote the song and previously worked with the Chemical Brothers on "Setting Sun".

"Let Forever Be" was the Chemical Brothers' fourth top-10 single in the United Kingdom, peaking at number nine on the UK Singles Chart. It was also successful in Hungary, where it debuted and peaked at number two, and it reached the top 40 in Ireland and New Zealand. In the United States, the single reached the top 30 on two Billboard charts: the Hot Dance Singles Sales chart and the Modern Rock Tracks chart.

Music video
The video for the track was directed by Michel Gondry, and utilized ground-breaking video and film effects in its depiction of a young woman's nightmares (the girl is played by actress and dancer Stephanie Landwehr). The video, which drew visual inspiration from Ray Davies' 1975 Granada TV production Starmaker, received much media attention and became one of the most well-known videos from the band. The video also makes specific visual and thematic references to the dance sequence "I Only Have Eyes For You" (music by Harry Warren; lyrics by Al Dubin), choreographed by Busby Berkeley for the Warner Bros. musical Dames (1934) directed by Ray Enright.

Pitchfork Media named it the "quintessential Michel Gondry video" and ranked it at number seven in their list of the "Top 50 Music Videos of the 1990s".

Track listings
Standard CD, 12-inch, and cassette single
 "Let Forever Be"
 "The Diamond Sky"
 "Studio K"

European CD single
 "Let Forever Be" (album version)
 "Studio K"

Credits and personnel
Credits are lifted from the Surrender album booklet.

Studios
 Recorded at Orinoco Studios (South London, England)
 Edited at Berwick Street Studios (London, England)
 Mastered at The Exchange (London, England)

Personnel

 The Chemical Brothers – production
 Tom Rowlands – writing
 Ed Simons – writing
 Noel Gallagher – writing, vocals (uncredited)
 Steve Dub – engineering
 Cheeky Paul – editing
 Mike Marsh – mastering

Charts

Release history

References

1999 singles
1999 songs
Astralwerks singles
The Chemical Brothers songs
Music videos directed by Michel Gondry
Songs written by Ed Simons
Songs written by Noel Gallagher
Songs written by Tom Rowlands
Virgin Records singles